Beach kabaddi at the 2010 Asian Beach Games was held from 12 December to 16 December 2010 in Muscat, Oman. Competitions were held at the North Al-Hail.

Medalists

Medal table

Results

Men

Preliminaries

Group A

Group B

Knockout round

Semifinals

Gold medal match

Women

Preliminaries

Gold medal match

References
 Official site

2010 Asian Beach Games events
2010
Asian